Pillara is a genus of New South Welsh sheetweb spiders that was first described by M. R. Gray & H. M. Smith in 2004.

Species
 it contains four species, found in New South Wales:
Pillara coolahensis Gray & Smith, 2004 – Australia (New South Wales)
Pillara griswoldi Gray & Smith, 2004 – Australia (New South Wales)
Pillara karuah Gray & Smith, 2004 (type) – Australia (New South Wales)
Pillara macleayensis Gray & Smith, 2004 – Australia (New South Wales)

See also
 List of Stiphidiidae species

References

Araneomorphae genera
Spiders of Australia
Stiphidiidae